A gubernatorial election was held in the State of México on Sunday, 3 July 2005.
Voters in Mexico's most populous state went to the polls to elect a governor to replace former incumbent Arturo Montiel Rojas of the Institutional Revolutionary Party (PRI).

The favorite candidate was PAN's Rubén Mendoza. It was thought the first runner-up would be PRD Yeidckol Polevnsky Gurwitz (born as Citlali Ibáñez Camacho) and last place by PRI's Enrique Peña. However, Rubén Mendoza made several mistakes in his campaign, appearing apparently drunk at events, boasting he led a group of supporters to steal campaign gifts from Peña's team and gave them with his own signature (he was taped while doing this). The PRD would have benefited from this, but Polevnksy had no political experience and support from Andrés Manuel López Obrador wasn't enough, specially after her true identity was discovered. So PRI's Peña rose to the first place, the PRD had a distant and low second place and PAN's Rubén Mendoza disappeared from public view.

Turnout was an unusually low 48%.

Results
With 93.38% of the votes it was clear that the PRI had managed to keep hold of the state.

See also
List of Mexican state governors

2005 elections in Mexico